Hatcher Hughes (12 February 1881, Polkville, North Carolina – 19 October 1945, New York City) was an American playwright who lived in Grover, NC, as featured in the book Images of America. He was on the teaching staff of Columbia University from 1912 onward. He was awarded the 1924 Pulitzer Prize for his 1922 play Hell-Bent Fer Heaven.

Early life and education
He was the tenth of eleven children of Andrew Jackson Hughes and Martha Jane Gold Hughes. He received both his undergraduate degree (1907) and master's degree (1909) in English from the University of North Carolina at Chapel Hill.

Career
Hell-bent fer Heaven (1924) was performed 122 times at the Klaw Theater (which later became the Avon and then CBS Theater #2). The play starred multiple Tony Award and Pulitzer Prize winner George Abbott (author of The Pajama Game, Fiorello, and Damn Yankees) and Clara Blandick (who played Auntie Em in The Wizard of Oz). It was made into a movie in 1926.

Hughes was a professor at Columbia University. A UNC graduate, he returned often to NC to speak and provide insight on Broadway. His detailed correspondence from New York to North Carolina and his mother provides a wealth of information to this day for Silver Screen researchers and archivists at the University of North Carolina.

Family
In 1930 he married Janet Ranney Cool. The marriage produced a daughter, Ann Ranney Hughes. During the First World War, he served as an Army captain. He and his family divided their time between their home in New York City and their farm in West Cornwall, Connecticut.

Works 
 A Marriage Made in Heaven (1918)
 Wake Up, Jonathan! (with Elmer Rice, 1921)
 Hell-Bent fer Heaven (1924), made into the 1926 motion picture of the same name
 Ruint (1920)
 It's a Grand Life (1930)
 The Lord Blesses the Bishop (co-author, 1934)

External links 
 
 

1881 births
1945 deaths
Pulitzer Prize for Drama winners
People from Cleveland County, North Carolina
Writers from North Carolina
University of North Carolina at Chapel Hill alumni
Columbia University faculty
American military personnel of World War I
20th-century American dramatists and playwrights
Members of the American Academy of Arts and Letters